This is a list of hardcore punk musical genres.

Bandana thrash
Christian hardcore
Crossover thrash
Crunkcore
Crust punk
D-beat
Deathcore
Digital hardcore
Easycore
Emo
Electronicore
Grindcore
Heavy hardcore
Jazzcore
Krishnacore
Mathcore
Melodic hardcore
Melodic metalcore
Metalcore
Nardcore
New York hardcore
Nintendocore
Nu metalcore
Positive hardcore
Post-hardcore
Powerviolence
Progressive metalcore
Queercore
Rapcore
Sass
Screamo
Skacore
Thrashcore
Washington, D.C. hardcore

See also
Punk rock subgenres
Punk rock
Punk subculture
List of microgenres

References

Genres
Lists of music genres
 Hardcore punk